Jan-Magnus Bruheim ( 15 February 1914 –10 August 1988) was a Norwegian poet and children's writer.

Biography
Bruheim was born at Skjåk in Oppland, Norway. 
He  was the son of Mathias Bruheim (1882-1967) and Torø Jonsdotter Lund (1880-1929).
After graduation from gymnasium, Bruheim spent one year at  Viken kristelege ungdomsskole at Gjøvik.
From 1958 to 1961 he was a teacher at Øygardskulen in Skjåk.

He published over forty books including twenty poetry collections and a range of children's books with poems and rhyme. His first poetry collection was Stengd dør from 1941. Among his children's books are Skrythøna from 1956, Røyskatten from 1961, and Doggmorgon from 1977.
 

He was awarded the Dobloug Prize in 1963.

He died at his home in Skjåk during 1988.

References

Related reading
 Eide, Ove, (editor), Magnhild Bruheim   (illustrator) Dikt i utval. Jan-Magnus Bruheim  	(Skjåk kommune forlag)

External links
Jan-Magnus Bruheim website

1914 births
1988 deaths
People from Skjåk
Nynorsk-language writers
Norwegian male poets
Norwegian educators
Norwegian children's writers
20th-century Norwegian poets
20th-century Norwegian male writers